Kalkini is an upazila of Madaripur District in the Division of Dhaka, Bangladesh.

History 
Kalkini Police Station was established in 1909 and it was turned into an upazila on 1 February 1984. Kalkini Municipality was established in 1997. The Dasar Police station was declared on March 2, 2013, with a partial area of Kalkini Police station. Earlier, the Dasar Union was divided into two units, Betwari and Dasar, and the Nabagram Union divided two other unions were named Sasikar and Nabagram. A police inquiry center was established at Dasar on February 2, 2012, with a total of six unions, including Gopalpur and Kazibakai unions.

Geography
Kalkini is located in between 23°00' and 23°10' North latitudes and in between 90°06' and 90°21' East longitudes. It has total area 279.98 km2. It is bounded by Madaripur Sadar Upazila on the north, Gaurnadi Upazila on the south, Gosairhat Upazila on the east, Kotalipara Upazila on the west.

Demographics
As of the 2011 Bangladesh census, Kalkini has 59311 Households and Population of 273,258. Males constitute 48.94% of the population, and females 51.06%.

Points of interest
 Senapati Dighi - Baligram
 Three domed Mosque of Miabari - Gopalpur
 Amirabad Moth - Gopalpur.

Administration
Kalkini Upazila is divided into Kalkini Municipality and 14 union parishads: Alinagar, Bali Gram, Banshgari, Char Daulatkhan, Dasar, Enayet Nagar, Gopalpur, Kayaria,  Kazibakai, Lakshmipur, Nabagram, Ramjanpur, Sahebrampur, and Shikar Mangol. The union parishads are subdivided into 160 mauzas and 171 villages.

Kalkini Municipality is subdivided into 9 wards and 38 mahallas.

Police stations 
 Kalkini police station
 Dasar police station

Education 
Kalkini has an average literacy rate of 49%; Male 51% and Female 47.2%.

Noted educational institutions 
 Government Sheikh Hasina Academy and Women's College (1995)
 Kalkini Syed Abul Hossain University College (1972)
 Kalkini Syed Abul Hossain Academy (1983)
 Sahebrampur Kabi Nazrul Islam College (1972)
 Shahid Smriti College, Shashikar (1973)
 Government  Kalkini Pilot High School (1946)
 Kalinagar High School (1904)
 Mahishmari Girls' High School (1918)
 Bir Mohan High School (1919)
 Nabagram High School (1943)
 Shashikar High School (1943)
 Sahebrampur Multilateral High School (1946)
 Khaser Hat High School (1960)
 Samitir Hat' High School (1964)
 Gopalpur High School (1970)
 Snanghata High School (1970)
 Darsana High School (1973)
 Shashikar Girls' High School (1982)

Notable residents 

 Zohra Begum Kazi
 Sunil Gangopadhyay
 Syed Abul Hossain
 Mohammad Asaduzzaman
 Abdus Sobhan Golap
 Syeda Rubaiyat Hossain
 Engr. M.A. Mannan education & social works

See also 
 Upazilas of Bangladesh
 Dhaka Division
 Madaripur District

References

 
Upazilas of Madaripur District